John Richard Arnold (born  October 5, 1955) is a former professional American football wide receiver in the National Football League. He attended the University of Wyoming and played with the Detroit Lions in 1979 and 1980.

External links
Pro-Football reference

1955 births
Living people
Detroit Lions players
Wyoming Cowboys football players